Chan Kin-por, GBS, JP (born 10 May 1954, China with family roots in Chaozhou, Guangdong) is a member of the Legislative Council of Hong Kong (Functional constituency, Insurance). He became chairman of the Legco Finance Committee in 2015. He has been appointed as Executive Council Member in 2022.

Biography
Known as 'KP', he grew up in a poor family in a squatter area in Wong Tai Sin, and didn't go to university, instead taking a job in the insurance industry.

After serving as the Chief Executive of the Hong Kong office of Munich Re for four years, Chan became a member of the Munich Re China Advisory Board and focused on his Legislative Council role. Prior to that, he was the Assistant General Manager and Head of Insurance Group of Hang Seng Bank.

He was chair of the Chinese Insurance Association of Hong Kong for two years from 1998, and of the Hong Kong Federation of Insurers from 2004 to 2005.

In 2008, he won a seat in the Legislative Council (Legco), representing the (insurance) functional constituency, after incumbent Bernard Chan stood down.

In the run-up to the 23 June 2010 Legco vote on the Hong Kong government's 2009 reform package, he offered his support if it included the Democratic Party's compromise proposal to have the five new district council functional constituency seats returned by popular election.

In 2015, the legislator, who was elected unopposed to his functional constituency seat, criticised the electoral regime in Hong Kong for filibustering pro-democratic legislators when speaking in favour of appropriations for the new IT Bureau, saying "everyone knows Hong Kong's elections are weird, and a prospective candidate can get elected with only 20–30 thousand votes". Chan defended the fact that he was unopposed at Legislative Council elections, saying that people ought not to underestimate functional consistencies. He suggested he was elected because chief executives of over a hundred insurance companies – the corporate votes making up the majority of his constituency – knew exactly who does things properly.

In October 2015, he was appointed chair of the Finance Committee, drawing praise and criticism for restricting procedural delays by pan-democratic councillors.

On 18 May 2020, Chan took, as had been foreshadowed by Legco president Andrew Leung three days earlier, the position of Legco presiding member in succession of democrat Dennis Kwok. This ended a deadlock, lasting for more than six months, over the election of the chair and deputy chair of the LegCo House Committee which pro-establishment politicians blamed on filibustering tactics of democrats in parliament. Chan took his seat in the session while surrounded by security guards. During the tumultuous meeting, Chan was decried for "foul play" by democrats and praised for doing a "good job" by pro-establishment politicians. Observers related the timing of the move to the wish of the Hong Kong government to pass the National Anthem Bill by the end of the month.

On 29 September 2021, the Legislative Council passed amendments to the National Flag and National Emblem Ordinance which outlawed desecration of the Chinese national flag and national emblem and also concerned the teaching of these national symbols in secondary schools. On this occasion, Chan said that the "absurd acts" of desecration that had taken place during the 2019-2020 Hong Kong protests were the responsibility of the opposition and "anti-China" media in Hong Kong. He advocated for launching national education in schools, saying that young Hongkongers did not "understand the patriotic sentiment".

In September 2022, Chan tested positive for COVID-19.

In December 2022, Chan said that "our bars have prettier girls" in Hong Kong, compared to the girls in Singapore.

See also
Politics of Hong Kong
Democratic development in Hong Kong

References

External links
 Legco biography

1954 births
Living people
Hong Kong businesspeople
Members of the Election Committee of Hong Kong, 2007–2012
HK LegCo Members 2008–2012
HK LegCo Members 2012–2016
HK LegCo Members 2016–2021
HK LegCo Members 2022–2025
Recipients of the Bronze Bauhinia Star
Recipients of the Gold Bauhinia Star